The National Interagency Confederation for Biological Research (NICBR, pronounced "Nick Burr") is a biotechnology and biodefense partnership and collaborative environment of eight U.S. Federal government agencies at Fort Detrick, Maryland, USA.

Structure 
Four federal cabinet level departments are represented in the NICBR: The DoD (2 agencies), the DHHS (4), the DHS (1) and the USDA (1). The NICBR agencies are:
 U.S. Army Medical Research and Materiel Command (USAMRMC), DoD
 National Institute of Allergy and Infectious Diseases  (NIAID), DHHS
 National Cancer Institute (NCI), DHHS
 Agricultural Research Service, USDA
 DHS Science and Technology Directorate, DHS
 Centers for Disease Control and Prevention (CDC), DHHS
 Naval Medical Research Center (NMRC), DoD
 U.S. Food and Drug Administration (FDA), DHHS

Some NICBR laboratories are physically consolidated on the National Interagency Biodefense Campus (NIBC) which includes all NICBR partners except NCI, which maintains its own campus on the Rosemont Avenue side of Fort Detrick. The Fort Detrick Interagency Coordinating Committee (FDICC) is the central hub of the NICBR governance structure, which is chaired by the Fort Detrick U.S. Army garrison commander.  It is composed of all NICBR partner representatives.

Leadership and personnel 
The FDICC meets twice a month and reports to the Executive Steering Committee (ESC), which is chaired by the commander, U. S. Army Medical Research and Materiel Command and is composed of equivalents across the partner agencies. The ESC reports to the NICBR Board of Directors (BOD), consisting of the chair, currently Army Surgeon General, and her equivalents across the partnership.  Collectively, the NICBR governance bodies provide strategic direction and oversight.

Working groups and subcommittees 
Reporting to the FDICC are seven subcommittees and three working groups:

The Sustainment Subcommittee
The Financial and Business Planning Subcommittee
The Public Affairs and Community Relations Subcommittee (PACRS)
The Educational Outreach Working Group (reporting through the PACRS) 
The Security Subcommittee
The Information Management & Information Technology Subcommittee
The Safety & Occupational Health Subcommittee (SOH)
The Medical Directors Working Group (reporting through the SOH)
The Scientific Interaction Subcommittee (SIS)
The Select Agent Program Working Group (reporting through the SIS)

The NICBR Partnership Office (NPO) provides a staffing function and coordinating center for and under the direction of the FDICC. The NPO works closely with the subcommittees and working groups to facilitate execution of their individual charters and action items handed down by the governance bodies.

References

Biotechnology organizations
Fort Detrick